Faculty of Law, Banaras Hindu University also known as the Law School, BHU  is a faculty in the Banaras Hindu University, Varanasi, India which offers undergraduate, postgraduate and doctorate courses in legal education. It was founded in 1924.

History

Started in 1924, Faculty of Law was one of the first faculties in the Banaras Hindu University. Initially classes started in the rooms of the Faculty of Arts, (Arts College), by the part-time teachers; mostly learned Advocates from Allahabad High Court.

Mahamana Pandit Madan Mohan Malviya served as the first dean of the faculty for three years.

Publications 

The Faculty of Law publishes the biannual Journal Banaras Law Journal.

Rankings
 

The Faculty of Law, Banaras Hindu University was ranked 20 among law schools in India by the National Institutional Ranking Framework (NIRF) in 2022. It was ranked 10 by Outlook Indias "Top 13 Government Law Institutes In India" of 2022 and eighth among law colleges by India Today.

See also
Banaras Hindu University
History of the Banaras Hindu University published by BHU Press (1966)
List of educational institutions in Varanasi

References

External links
 http://www.bhu.ac.in/

Law schools in Uttar Pradesh
Departments of the Banaras Hindu University
Educational institutions established in 1922
1922 establishments in India